Ernest Arthur Edghill (3 February 1879, Gibraltar – 23 August 1912), B.D., was an Anglican priest and theological writer. He was the Hulsean Lecturer at Cambridge 1910–11, and Lecturer in Ecclesiastical History at King's College London.

Ernest Arthur Edghill was educated at Eton and King's College, Cambridge, where he studied theology.

Works
Evidential value of Prophecy
Amos
Faith and Fact
The Spirit of Power
The Revelation of the Son of God

References

1879 births
1912 deaths
People educated at Eton College
Alumni of King's College, Cambridge
Academics of King's College London
Gibraltarian clergy
20th-century English Anglican priests
Academics of the University of Cambridge
British theologians